Diprion is a genus of conifer sawflies in the family Diprionidae. There are at least 12 described species in Diprion.

Species
These species belong to the genus Diprion:
 Diprion hani D.R. Smith & Cho, 2008 – South Korea
 Diprion hutacharernae D.R. Smith, 1979 – Oriental region
 Diprion jingyuanensis G.R. Xiao & Y. Zhang, 1994 – China
 Diprion kashmirensis M.S. Saini & Thind, 1993 – India
 Diprion koreanus Takagi, 1931 – Japan,	Korea, Russia
 Diprion liuwanensis X. Huang & G.R. Xiao, 1983 – China
 Diprion nanhuaensis G.R. Xiao, 1983 – China
 Diprion nipponicus Rohwer, 1910 (black-spotted pine sawfly) – Japan
 Diprion pini Linnaeus, 1758 (pine sawfly) – Palaearctic
 Diprion similis (Hartig, 1834) (introduced pine sawfly) Palaearctic, Nearctic
 Diprion tianmunicus Zhou & X. Huang, 1983 – China
 Diprion wenshanicus G.R. Xiao & Zhou, 1983 – China

References

Sawflies
Hymenoptera genera
Taxa named by Franz von Paula Schrank